1996–97 Országos Bajnokság I (men's water polo) was the 91st water polo championship in Hungary.

First stage 

Pld - Played; W - Won; L - Lost; PF - Points for; PA - Points against; Diff - Difference; Pts - Points.

Championship Playoff

Sources 
Gyarmati Dezső: Aranykor (Hérodotosz Könyvkiadó és Értékesítő Bt., Budapest, 2002.)

Seasons in Hungarian water polo competitions
Hungary
1996 in water polo
1996 in Hungarian sport
1997 in water polo
1997 in Hungarian sport